Khalifa Ababacar Sall (born 1 January 1956) is a Senegalese politician. He is a former government minister and a former mayor of Dakar.

He is the leader of Manko Taxawu Sénégal in the 2022 Senegalese parliamentary election.

References 

Living people
1956 births
Mayors of Dakar
Socialist Party of Senegal politicians
Trade ministers of Senegal
Members of the National Assembly (Senegal)